Russ Germain (1947 – February 2, 2009) was a Canadian broadcaster who worked for CBC Radio from 1973 to 2002. He was born in New Liskeard, Ontario.

He hosted the flagship news programs World Report and The World at Six.

In 1990, Germain was made the CBC's broadcast language adviser, in which role he provided suggested pronunciations of obscure vocabulary for other announcers.

External links
CBC obituary

1947 births
2009 deaths
Deaths from lung cancer
Canadian radio news anchors
People from Temiskaming Shores
Deaths from cancer in Ontario
CBC Radio hosts